Milesville is an unincorporated community in Haakon County, South Dakota, United States. Although not tracked by the Census Bureau, Milesville has been assigned the ZIP code of 57553.  The village consists of one church, a post office, a veterinary clinic, and a volunteer fire department.

Miles was laid out in 1905 by one Mr. Miles, and named for him.

References

Unincorporated communities in Haakon County, South Dakota
Unincorporated communities in South Dakota